Stationed in Bell, CA, the 222nd Broadcast Operations Detachment (BOD) is an Army Reserve public affairs unit that is capable of operating an Armed Forces Network (AFN) radio/television station as well as providing media relations support for the U.S. Army Reserves, Regular Army, and Department of Defense. Their products include videography packages such as video news releases (VNR), B-Roll packages, veteran history projects, and training videos. The 222nd has a long, proud history of telling the stories of soldiers as they serve all over the world. Most recently, the 222nd supported the U.S. Army's public affairs mission with two, year-long tours of duty in Baghdad, Iraq, were the unit was awarded the Meritorious Unit Commendation (Army), 2003–2004. The 222nd BOD supports the 201st Press Camp Headquarters (PCH) in Bell, CA, and the 63rd Regional Support Command (RSC) in Mountain View, CA.

Mission 

The mission of the 222nd BOD is to establish and operate mobile radio/television broadcast facilities, perform as the broadcast support arm for a Public Affairs Operations Center, and produce broadcast products for distribution to internal and external worldwide audiences through the American Forces Radio Television Services.

About Army Public Affairs 

Public Affairs fulfills the Army's obligation to keep the American people and the Army informed, and helps to establish the conditions that lead to confidence in America's Army and its readiness to conduct operations in peacetime, conflict and war.

Enlisted Soldiers in the 222nd BOD are Broadcast and Journalism Specialists (46S) and Multimedia Illustrators (25M), along with a Unit Administrative Specialist (42A) and a Unit Supply Specialist (92Y). Officers in a Public Affairs unit can come from all branches of the U.S. Army. They need only complete the Public Affairs Qualification Course in Ft. Meade, Maryland to receive the Functional Area MOS for Public Affairs (46A). For both enlisted soldiers and officers, Public Affairs units are available in all components of the U.S. Army (Active, Reserve, and Army National Guard).

Army Public Affairs Broadcast Specialists are involved in creating, filming, reporting, hosting and editing news and entertainment radio and television programs. They are primarily responsible for participating in and supervising the operation of audio or video news for the American Forces Network (AFN), The Pentagon Channel or Armed Forces Radio and Television Service (AFRTS).
Combat Correspondents, or broadcast journalists in the 222nd prepare scripts and news copy for radio and television programs and participate as hosts, announcers, masters of ceremonies, and actors in radio and television broadcasts. Journalists also research, prepare and disseminate information through news releases, radio and television products. They perform as writers, reporters, editors, videographers, producers, and program hosts in radio and television productions.

Requirements 
In order to become a Broadcast and Journalism Specialist (46S) in the U.S. Army, a soldier must meet the following requirements.

Initial Requirements 
 Training Information: 25 weeks, at the Defense Information School (DINFOS), Fort Meade, MD
 
 ASVAB Score Required: General Technical (GT): 107
 
 Security Clearance: Secret
 
 Strength Requirement: Light
 
 Physical Profile Requirement: 222121

Other Requirements
 Be able to type 20 WPM prior to school attendance;
 Have no speech impediments;
 Show proof by official transcript of having successfully completed at least two years of high school English;
 Must possess a valid vehicle operator license;

Similar Civilian Occupations
Broadcast News Analysts
Public Relations Specialists
Radio and Television Announcers
Reporters and Correspondents 

Officers need to meet the following requirements in order to join.

Initial Requirements 
 Must have completed their Basic Branch BOLC. 
 Attend and complete the Public Affairs Qualification Course (PACS-Q), at the Defense Information School (DINFOS), Ft. Meade, MD.

Similar Civilian Occupations 
 Public relations manager
 Communications manager
 News editor
 Web manager
 Correspondent
 Director
 Producer

References 

Detachments of the United States Army
Military units and formations of the United States Army Reserve